The following is the final results of the 1997 Asian Wrestling Championships being held in Iran and Taiwan.

Medal table

Team ranking

Medal summary

Men's freestyle

Men's Greco-Roman

Women's freestyle

See also
 List of sporting events in Taiwan

References
UWW Database

Asia
W
W
Asian Wrestling Championships
W
Wrestling competitions in Taiwan
International wrestling competitions hosted by Iran